The 2022 Illinois State Redbirds football team represented Illinois State University as a member of the Missouri Valley Football Conference (MVFC) during the 2022 NCAA Division I FCS football season. Led 14th-year head coach Brock Spack, the Redbirds compiled an overall record of 6–5 with a mark of 4–4 in conference play, tying for sixth place in the MVFC. Illinois State played home games at Hancock Stadium in Normal, Illinois.

Schedule

Game summaries

at No. 18 (FBS) Wisconsin

Valparaiso

Eastern Illinois

No. 19 Southern Illinois

at Northern Iowa

South Dakota

at Indiana State

at No. 4 North Dakota State

Youngstown State

at No. 1 South Dakota State

Western Illinois

References

Illinois State
Illinois State Redbirds football seasons
Illinois State Redbirds football